Paul Dimo (10 June 1905 – 17 April 1990) was a Romanian electrical engineer, creator of REI method of nodal analysis of electric networks. He contributed also to the development of electrification Plan of Romania.

Biography
Born in Turnu Severin, he studied electricity in Paris.
Between 1930-1945 he was Head of Gas and Electricity Society in Bucharest. Then he worked as a researcher in the Institute of Energy Engineering of the Romanian Academy.

Awards
State prize for the Electrification Plan of Romania (1950) and for the design of hydroelectric power station Moroieni (1954) 
Montefiore award for electric networks analysis
Traian Vuia prize of the Romanian Acadedemy for steady stability analysis of electric networks

Notes

External links
 Paul Dimo AGIR General Association of Industrialists in Romania
REI Method

1905 births
1990 deaths
People from Drobeta-Turnu Severin
Romanian electrical engineers
Titular members of the Romanian Academy